The 2022 U-16 International Dream Cup (officially in ), was the 6th edition of the U-16 International Dream Cup, an annual, international, age-restricted football tournament organized by the JFA, Japanese football's governing body. It was held in Sendai, Japan from 8 June to 12 June 2022. Japan were crowned champions for the 4th time, in an unbeaten three-win campaign.

Format 
The four invited teams played a round-robin tournament.  A penalty-shootout were played when the match resulted in a draw. Points awarded in the group stage followed the formula of three points for a win, two points for a penalty-shootout win, one point for a penalty-shootout loss, and zero points for a loss. In the event, if two teams were tied in points, tie-breakers would be applied in the order of goal difference, goals scored, head-to-head result, and a fair play score based on the number of yellow and red cards.

Venue

Teams

Standings

Results

Statistics

Goalscorers

See also 
 Japan Football Association (JFA)

References

External links 
 U-16 International Dream Cup 2022 
 U-16 International Dream Cup 2022 
 U-16 International Dream Cup 2022 Highlights (8 videos) on JFATV on YouTube

2022 in Japanese football
U-16 International Dream Cup